Sarah Ellen Allgood (30 October 1880 – 13 September 1950), known as Sara Allgood, was an Irish-American actress. She first studied drama with the Irish nationalist Daughters of Ireland and was at the opening of the Irish National Theatre Society. 

In 1904, she had her first big role in Spreading the News and was a full-time actress the following year. In 1915, she toured Australia and New Zealand as the lead in Peg o' My Heart. Her acting career continued in Dublin, London, and the U.S. She appeared in a number of films, most notably being nominated for the Academy Award for Best Supporting Actress for her role as Beth Morgan in the 1941 film How Green Was My Valley. She became an American citizen in 1945 and died of a heart attack in 1950.

Early life
Allgood was born on 30 October 1880 at 45 Middle Abbey Street in Dublin, then still part of the United Kingdom of Great Britain and Ireland at the time, a  daughter of Margaret ( Harold) and compositor George Allgood. Her mother was Catholic, while her father was Protestant. She had two baptisms, a Catholic baptism on 3 November 1880 and a Church of Ireland (Protestant Anglican) baptism on 21 November 1880.

She had seven siblings, one of whom was fellow actress Maire O'Neill, although the two were later reportedly estranged. A brother, Tom, became a Roman Catholic priest, who took the religious name of "Father Vincent". 

After her father's death when she was a young girl, her mother returned to work as a furniture trader. Allgood began work as soon as she was able, apprenticed to a French polisher near her mother's workplace who sold high quality antique and modern furniture from their warerooms at 19 and 20 Bachelor's Walk, Dublin, and who also operated as cabinet-makers, upholsterers, valuers, house agents, and auctioneers.

Career

Allgood joined the Irish nationalist Daughters of Ireland, where she first began to study drama under the direction of Maud Gonne and William Fay. She began her acting career at the Abbey Theatre and was in the opening of the Irish National Theatre Society. Her first big role was in December 1904 at the opening of Lady Gregory's Spreading the News. By 1905 she was a full-time actress, touring England and North America.

In 1915, Allgood was cast as the lead in J. Hartley Manners' comedy Peg o' My Heart which toured Australia and New Zealand in 1916. She played the lead role opposite her Peg o' My Heart co-star and then-husband Gerald Henson in J. A. Lipman's 1918 silent film Just Peggy, shot in Sydney. After his death and her return to Ireland, she continued to perform at the Abbey Theatre. Her most memorable performance was in Seán O'Casey's Juno and the Paycock in 1923. She won acclaim in London when she played Bessie Burgess in O'Casey's The Plough and the Stars in 1926.

Allgood was frequently featured in early Hitchcock films, such as Blackmail (1929), Juno and the Paycock (1930), and Sabotage (1936). She had a significant role in Storm in a Teacup (1937).

After many successful theatre tours of America, she pursued a film career. She was nominated for a Best Supporting Actress Academy Award for her role as Beth Morgan in the 1941 film How Green Was My Valley. She had memorable roles in the 1941 retelling of Dr. Jekyll and Mr. Hyde, It Happened in Flatbush (1942), Jane Eyre (1943), The Lodger (1944), The Keys of the Kingdom (1944), The Spiral Staircase (1946), The Fabulous Dorseys (1947), and the original Cheaper by the Dozen (1950).

Personal life
In September 1916, Allgood married her Peg o' My Heart co-star Gerald Henson while they were touring in Melbourne. In January 1918, they had a daughter named Mary who died one day later. In November of that year, the Spanish flu pandemic claimed Henson's life.

Allgood settled in Hollywood in 1940 and became an American citizen in 1945.

Death
On 13 September 1950, at the age of 69, Allgood died of a heart attack at her home in Woodland Hills, California. She was buried in Holy Cross Cemetery, Culver City.

Partial filmography

 Just Peggy (1918) - Peggy
 Blackmail (1929) - Mrs. White
 To What Red Hell (1929)
 Juno and the Paycock (1930) - Mrs. Boyle ('Juno')
 The World, the Flesh, the Devil (1932) - Emme Stanger
 The Fortunate Fool (1933) - Rose
 Lily of Killarney (1934) - Mrs O'Connor
 Irish Hearts (1934) - Mrs. Gogarthy
 Lazybones (1935) - Bridget
 Peg of Old Drury (1935) - Irish Woman on Boat (uncredited)
 The Passing of the Third Floor Back (1935) - Mrs. de Hooley
 Crime Unlimited (1935) - Jewel Thief (uncredited)
 Riders to the Sea (1936, Short) - Maurya
 Pot Luck (1936) - Mrs. Kelly
 It's Love Again (1936) - Mrs. Hopkins
 Southern Roses (1936) - Miss Florence
 Sabotage (1936)
 Kathleen Mavourneen (1937) - Mary Ellen O'Dwyer
 Storm In A Teacup (1937) - Honoria Hegarty
 The Sky's the Limit (1938) - Mrs. O'Reilly
 The Londonderry Air (1938) - Widow Rafferty
 On the Night of the Fire (1939) - Charwoman
 That Hamilton Woman (1941) - Mrs. Cadogan-Lyon
 Dr. Jekyll and Mr. Hyde (1941) - Mrs. Higgins
 Lydia (1941) - Mary
 How Green Was My Valley (1941) - Mrs. Morgan
 Roxie Hart (1942) - Mrs. Morton
 This Above All (1942) - Waitress
 It Happened in Flatbush (1942) - Mrs. 'Mac' McAvoy
 The Light of Heart (1942)
 The War Against Mrs. Hadley (1942) - Mrs. Michael Fitzpatrick
 Life Begins at Eight-Thirty (1942) - Alma Lothian, Robert's Aunt
 City Without Men (1943) - Mrs. Maria Barton
 Forever and a Day (1943) - Cook (1917) (scenes deleted)
 Jane Eyre (1943) - Bessie
 The Lodger (1944) - Ellen Bonting
 Between Two Worlds (1944) - Mrs. Midget
 The Keys of the Kingdom (1944) - Sister Martha
 The Strange Affair of Uncle Harry (1945) - Nona
 Kitty (1945) - Old Meg
 The Spiral Staircase (1946) - Nurse Barker
 Cluny Brown (1946) - Mrs. Maile
 The Fabulous Dorseys (1947) - Mrs. Dorsey
 Ivy (1947) - Martha Huntley
 Mother Wore Tights (1947) - Grandmother McKinley
 Mourning Becomes Electra (1947) - Adam Brant's Landlady
 My Wild Irish Rose (1947) - Mrs. Brennan
 Man from Texas (1948) - Aunt Belle
 One Touch of Venus (1948) - Landlady
 The Girl from Manhattan (1948) - Mrs. Beeler
 The Accused (1949) - Mrs. Conner
 Challenge to Lassie (1949) - Mrs. MacFarland
 Cheaper by the Dozen (1950) - Mrs. Monahan
 Sierra (1950) - Mrs. Jonas (final film role)

References

Further reading

External links

NY Public Library, Billy Rose collection; accessed October 26, 2015.
Portrait gallery (University of Washington, Sayre Collection); accessed October 26, 2015. 
 (with incorrect year of birth)

1880 births
1950 deaths
American film actresses
American stage actresses
Irish emigrants to the United States
Irish film actresses
Irish stage actresses
Actresses from Dublin (city)
Burials at Holy Cross Cemetery, Culver City
20th-century Irish actresses
20th-century American actresses